The Chinese giant flying squirrel (Petaurista xanthotis) is a species of rodent in the family Sciuridae. It is endemic to China. It inhabits high-elevation spruce forests in China and feeds nocturnally on young shoots, leaves, and pine nuts. It nests in trees but does not hibernate. Its litter size averages two.

References

Rodents of China
Petaurista
Mammals described in 1872
Taxonomy articles created by Polbot